Christ Before the High Priest is an oil on canvas painting by Dutch artist Gerard van Honthorst, created c. 1617, now in the National Gallery, in London, which bought it in 1922.

History
Between 1610-1620 Gerard van Honthorst stayed and worked in Rome. The painter Joachim von Sandrart (a pupil of Honthorst) claims that the Marquis Vincenzo Giustiniani had Honthorst made the painting for the collection of his palace. Giustiniani, in his collection, had another painting by the painter Luca Cambiaso and Honthorst perceived its subject and style and also by other Italian masters such as Caravaggio.

He made the following steps: 1) private collection Vincenzo Giustiniani, Rome, 1638-1804; 2) private collection Lucien Bonaparte, Paris, 1804-1820; 3) private collection Duke of Lucca 1820-1840; 4) private collection Cromartie Sutherland-Leveson-Gower, IV, Great Britain 1840-1913; 5) National Gallery, London, 1922.

Description
It is a scene from the canonical gospels concerning the Passion of Jesus. After capturing Christ, he was led to the high priest Caiaphas, where the scribes and high priests were waiting for him.

Honthorst caught the moment when Caiaphas poses the last question to the accused. The face of Jesus expresses the peace and self-control that, according to the testimony, he maintained during the entire interrogation process. The scene takes place at night. On the table in the center is a candle -- the only source of light. Illuminate the book and the faces of the two main protagonists of the event: Jesus and Caiaphas. Caiaphas is seated behind the table where the book of the Mosaic law is and points his finger accusingly at Jesus. Caiaphas supported the interpretation of the Mosaic law that Jesus allegedly broke. In the background, behind Christ and Caiaphas, are the figures of other high priests. They await judgment and their faces are shrouded in darkness that increases the tension.

References

Paintings depicting the Passion of Jesus
1617 paintings
Paintings by Gerard van Honthorst
Collections of the National Gallery, London
Books in art